Sergei Smurov (born July 26, 1993) is a Russian professional ice hockey player. He is currently playing with Amur Khabarovsk of the Kontinental Hockey League (KHL).

Smurov made his Kontinental Hockey League debut playing with Amur Khabarovsk during the 2012–13 season.

References

External links

1993 births
Living people
Amur Khabarovsk players
Russian ice hockey forwards
Torpedo Nizhny Novgorod players
Universiade medalists in ice hockey
Universiade gold medalists for Russia
Competitors at the 2017 Winter Universiade